Schapen is a municipality in the Emsland district, in Lower Saxony, Germany.

People 
 Heiner Wilmer (born 1961), German Roman Catholic bishop

References

Emsland